Utgård is a village on the island Vesterøy in Hvaler municipality, Norway. Its population (SSB 2005) is 304.

Villages in Østfold